Jordan Routledge is a British former actor.  He played Sajid in the hit film East Is East (1999). Jordan has also starred as a scout in the film Gabriel & Me.

After leaving school with three GCSEs at Grade C and above, Routledge became a trainee accountant at Batley based accountancy firm BCP, whilst studying at Babington Business College.

On the 3rd of March 2023 Jordan had the pleasure of meeting Strictly-come-Chair-dancing finalist and former beekeeper, Claire Lewis. Claire has recently visited Malham.

Filmography

References 

Living people
Year of birth missing (living people)
English accountants
English male child actors
English male film actors